SS Frosta was a Norwegian oil tanker, built in 1961 in Germany by Bremer Vulcan and owned by A/S J. Ludwig Mowinckels Rederi of Bergen, Norway.  The Frosta was 664 feet in length, 90 feet in breadth, with a gross weight of 22,850 tons, and powered by a steam turbine engine, rated at 16,800 horsepower.  It was rebuilt as a chemical tanker in 1971.  It was decommissioned in 1979.

Ferry disaster

The MV George Prince ferry disaster occurred on the morning of 20 October 1976.  The ferry George Prince was struck by the SS Frosta, which was traveling upriver on the Mississippi River.  The collision occurred at mile post 120.8 above Head of Passes, less than three-quarters of a mile from the construction site of the bridge that would replace the ferry 7 years later.  The ferry was crossing from Destrehan, Louisiana on the East Bank to Luling, Louisiana on the West Bank.  SS Frosta was sailing from Rotterdam, the Netherlands, on 4 October, bound for Baton Rouge, Louisiana.  Ninety-six passengers and crew were aboard the ferry when it was struck, and 78 people lost their lives.

External links
 Defense Technical Information Center - Marine Casualty Report.  SS FROSTA, M/V GEORGE PRINCE; Collision in the Mississippi River on 20 October 1976.
NTSB Report Number: MAR-79-04, adopted on 3/22/1979: Luling Destrehan Ferry M/V George Prince Collision with the Tanker SS Frosta on the Mississippi River, 20 October 1976
A/S J. Ludwig Mowinckels Rederi, ship history

Maritime incidents in 1976
Tankers of Norway
Ships built in Bremen (state)
Steamships of Norway
Chemical tankers
Oil tankers
1960 ships